Break of Day is a 1928 novel by the French writer Colette. It was adapted into a 1980 film directed by Jacques Demy.

Reception
Elaine Marks reviewed the book for The New York Times in 1961: "It may well be that, for some, Colette's Break of Day will appear to be a slightly precious treatise on the themes of nature and love. For others, it may well be a source of strength, a poetic, that is to say a rhythmical, response to the difficulties of growing old and dying, written by a woman who grew old and who died with comparable dignity and grace."

Bibliography

Title:	Break of Day
Author	Colette
Editor:	Farrar, Straus and Giroux, 1961
Pages Nº: 143 p.

See also
 1928 in literature
 20th-century French literature

References

1928 French novels
Novels by Colette
French novels adapted into films